Mendrelgang Gewog (Dzongkha: མནྜལ་སྒང་) a gewog (a village block or county ) of Tsirang District, Bhutan.

References

Gewogs of Bhutan
Tsirang District